John Newcombe and Roger Taylor were the defending US Open men's doubles champions, but did not defend their title as a team.

Sixth-seeded Cliff Drysdale and Roger Taylor won the title by defeating unseeded Owen Davidson and John Newcombe 6–4, 7–6, 6–3 in the final.

Seeds

Draw

Finals

Top half

Section 1

Section 2

Bottom half

Section 3

Section 4

References

External links
 Association of Tennis professionals (ATP) results archive
1972 US Open – Men's draws and results at the International Tennis Federation

Men's Doubles
US Open (tennis) by year – Men's doubles